Check It Out! with Dr. Steve Brule is a spin-off of Tim and Eric Awesome Show, Great Job! starring John C. Reilly as Dr. Steve Brule. The series premiered on Cartoon Network's late night programming block, Adult Swim, on May 16, 2010. The series has completed four seasons with six episodes each.

Series overview

Episodes

Season 1 (2010)

Season 2 (2012)

Season 3 (2014)

Season 4 (2016)

Special (2017)

See also
 Bagboy (TV special)

References

Check It Out! with Dr. Steve Brule
Tim & Eric